Conway–Horry County Airport  is a county-owned public-use airport located three nautical miles (6 km) west of the central business district of Conway, a city in Horry County, South Carolina, United States.

Conway–Horry County airport serves mostly general aviation with maintenance and refueling of aircraft. The airport is located off of U.S. Route 378 west of the city of Conway.

Although most U.S. airports use the same three-letter location identifier for the FAA and IATA, this airport is assigned HYW by the FAA but has no designation from the IATA.

Facilities and aircraft 
It has one runway designated 4/22 with a 4,401 by 75 ft (1,341 x 23 m) asphalt surface.

For the 12-month period ending September 11, 2007, the airport had 43,050 aircraft operations, an average of 117 per day: ~99% general aviation, <1% air charter and <1% military. At that time there were 39 aircraft based at this airport: 90% single-engine and 10% multi-engine.

See also 
 Myrtle Beach International Airport

References

External links 
 Horry County Department of Airports
 South Carolina Division of Aeronautics
 
 

Airports in South Carolina
Buildings and structures in Conway, South Carolina
Transportation in Horry County, South Carolina